Sir Mark Evelyn Heath  (27 May 1927 – 28 September 2005) was a British diplomat who served as British Envoy Extraordinary and Minister Plenipotentiary to the Holy See from 1980 to 1982 and the first Ambassador to the Holy See from 1982 to 1985.

Career
Heath was born at Emsworth, Hampshire, the son of Commander John Moore Heath and Hilary Heath (née Salter). He was the great-great-great-grandson of James Heath, the eighteenth-century engraver and associate member of the Royal Academy. Heath was educated first at Marlborough College and then at Queens' College, Cambridge, where he read history. During World War II he served on minesweepers with the RNVR. He joined the Foreign Office in 1950.

In 1962, he was appointed as British Consul to Bulgaria. While there, his considerable height (he stood 6 ft 8in tall) caused the visiting Soviet premiere, Nikita Khrushchev to embrace him and remark that he would have made a fine Communist. Sir Mark was Head of the Commodities Department from 1970 to 1971. He served as Counsellor with the OECD from 1971 to 1974, and then as the Head of the West African Department at the Foreign and Commonwealth Office from 1975 to 1978. He also held postings in Indonesia, Denmark, Canada and France.

From 1980 to 1985, he served as the United Kingdom's diplomatic representative to the Holy See, first as minister plenipotentiary and then from 1982 as ambassador. Heath's appointment represented the resumption of full diplomatic relations between Britain and the Holy See for the first time since Henry VIII's break with the Catholic Church in 1534. He was involved in the negotiations surrounding the historic 1982 visit of Pope John Paul II to Britain, a trip which was almost cancelled because of the conflict between Britain and predominantly Catholic Argentina.

After retiring from the Diplomatic Service he was Head of Protocol for the Hong Kong Government (1985–88). He was made a CMG in 1980, then was knighted and made a KCVO the same year.

A committed Anglican, during his retirement he served as a steward at Bath Abbey.

In 1954 he married Margaret, daughter of Nobel-laureate Lawrence Bragg, by whom he had a daughter and two sons. He died in 2005. Lady Heath died in 2022.

See also
British Ambassadors to the Holy See

References

1927 births
2005 deaths
Royal Navy officers
Royal Naval Volunteer Reserve personnel of World War II
Knights Commander of the Royal Victorian Order
People educated at Marlborough College
Alumni of Queens' College, Cambridge
People from Emsworth
Ambassadors of the United Kingdom to Chad
Ambassadors of the United Kingdom to the Holy See